Alexander Stille (born 1 January 1957 in New York City) is an American author and journalist. He is the son of Ugo Stille, a well-known Italian journalist and a former editor of Italy's Milan-based Corriere della Sera newspaper. Alexander Stille graduated from Yale and later the Columbia University Graduate School of Journalism. He has written many articles on the subject of Italy, in particular its politics and the Mafia.

His first book, Benevolence and Betrayal: Five Italian Jewish Families Under Fascism, was chosen by the Times Literary Supplement as one of the best books of 1992 and received the Los Angeles Times book award. In the chapter The Rabbi, the Priest and the Aviator: A Story of Rescue in Genoa he writes about the life of Massimo Teglio during the war.

In 1995 he wrote Excellent Cadavers: The Mafia and the Death of the First Italian Republic, an investigation into the Sicilian Mafia in the latter half of the twentieth century and in particular the events leading up to the major crackdown against the criminal organization in the 1990s following the bloodthirsty reign of Salvatore Riina. The book was dedicated to the memory of anti-mafia judges Giovanni Falcone and Paolo Borsellino. The events outlined in the book were made into a 1999 movie of the same name.

In 2003 he wrote The Future of the Past, about the efforts to preserve historical monuments and documentary evidence of ancient times. In 2006 he wrote The Sack of Rome: How a Beautiful European Country with a Fabled History and a Storied Culture Was Taken Over by a Man Named Silvio Berlusconi, about Silvio Berlusconi. His book The Force of Things: A Marriage in War and Peace was published in February 2013.

Stille also writes for The Boston Globe, The New York Review of Books, The New York Times and The New Yorker. For a short time, Stille lived in Milan, Italy, but currently resides in New York City and is the San Paolo Professor of International Journalism at Columbia. He was married to poet Lexi Rudnitsky until her death in January 2005. They had one son, Samuel, who was born in October 2004. Stille was named a Guggenheim Fellow in 2008.

Bibliography

References

External links
 Horrors And Heroes by John Elson, book review of Benevolence and Betrayal
Transcript of an interview with Stille from PBS
Stille archive from The New York Review of Books
The Force of Things: A Marriage in War and Peace

1957 births
Living people
American male journalists
Yale University alumni
Columbia University Graduate School of Journalism alumni
American non-fiction crime writers
Historians of the Sicilian Mafia
The New Yorker people
Phillips Academy alumni
Carnegie Council for Ethics in International Affairs